Marmyzhi is a rural locality in Kosteltsevsky Selsoviet Rural Settlement, Kurchatovsky District, Kursk Oblast, Russia. Population:

Geography 
The village is located on the Prutishche River in the basin of the Seym, 69 km from the Russia–Ukraine border, 49 km north-west of Kursk, 20 km north-west of the district center – the town Kurchatov, 5 km from the selsoviet center – Kosteltsevo.

 Climate
Marmyzhi has a warm-summer humid continental climate (Dfb in the Köppen climate classification).

Transport 
Marmyzhi is located 36.5 km from the federal route  Crimea Highway, 20 km from the road of regional importance  (Kursk – Lgov – Rylsk – border with Ukraine), 13.5 km from the road  (Lgov – Konyshyovka), on the road of intermunicipal significance  (38K-023 – Olshanka – Marmyzhi – 38K-017), 13,5 km from the nearest railway halt 565 km (railway line Navlya – Lgov-Kiyevsky).

The rural locality is situated 55 km from Kursk Vostochny Airport, 149 km from Belgorod International Airport and 258 km from Voronezh Peter the Great Airport.

References

Notes

Sources

Rural localities in Kurchatovsky District, Kursk Oblast